are a Japanese football club based in Kurashiki, Okayama. They play in the Chūgoku Soccer League.

History
The club was founded in 1946 to provide recreational activities in the war-torn Mizushima area of Kurashiki city. They joined the Okayama Prefecture League in 1965 and were promoted to the Chūgoku Regional League in 1979 for the first time.

They were relegated to the Prefecture League in 1982 and stayed there for 8 years. After re-entering the Chūgoku League, they won 5 championships before being promoted to the JFL in 2005.

In recent years they have adopted the moniker "Red Adamant" (after their parent company Mitsubishi Motors and its former flagship football club, now known as Urawa Red Diamonds), with an aim to eventually join J. League and be a star club in their own right. A potential obstacle to this will be the newly promoted Fagiano Okayama, with whom they have had to share Momotaro Athletic Stadium in Okayama City for recent JFL fixtures.

In 2008 they finished dead last of 18, but were spared the drop due to the promotion of Okayama, Kataller Toyama and Tochigi SC.

In November 2009, the club announced they would withdraw from the JFL after the end of the 2009 season because of the lack of the financial resources to operate in the league. After their membership application was refused by the Chugoku Regional League, they decided to compete in the Okayama Prefectural League Division 1 in 2010.

In November 2016 they rebounded by winning the Shakaijin Cup, and one year later the 2017 Chugoku Soccer League.

In 2021, they won for the 7th time the Chugoku Soccer League, but as was the situation in 2017, they weren't able to win the promotion spot for JFL, as in both times they failed to pass through the group stage of the Japanese Regional Champions League.

Current squad

League record

Honours
Chugoku Soccer League (7): 1992, 1999, 2002, 2003, 2004, 2017, 2021
Shakaijin Cup (1): 2016
Okayama Prefectural Soccer Championship (16): 1985, 1986, 1988, 1991, 1996, 1997, 1998, 1999, 2004, 2005, 2006, 2007, 2009, 2017, 2018, 2020, 2021

References

External links
Official Website  

Football clubs in Japan
Association football clubs established in 1946
Sports teams in Okayama Prefecture
1946 establishments in Japan
Mitsubishi Motors
Japan Football League clubs
Works association football clubs in Japan
Kurashiki